RFEM is a 3D finite element analysis software working under Microsoft Windows computer operating systems. RFEM can be used for structural analysis and design of steel, concrete, timber, glass, membrane and tensile structures as well as for plant and mechanical engineering or dynamic analysis. The API technology Web Services allows you to create your own desktop or web-based applications by controlling all objects included in RFEM. By providing libraries and functions, you can develop your own design checks, effective modeling of parametric structures, as well as optimization and automation processes using the programming languages Python and C#.

RFEM is used by more than 10,000 companies, 86,000 users and many universities in 95 countries.

BIM Integration 
RFEM offers numerous interfaces for data exchange within the BIM process. All relevant building data is digitally maintained within a three-dimensional model, which then is used throughout all of the planning stages. As a result, the various CAD and structural analysis programs are using the same model, which is directly transferred between the programs.

Besides direct interfaces to Autodesk AutoCAD, Autodesk Revit Structure, Autodesk Structural Detailing, Bentley Systems applications (ISM) and Tekla Structures, RFEM has interfaces for Industry Foundation Classes, CIS/2 and others.

Materials and cross-section libraries 
RFEM's library of materials includes various types of concrete, metal, timber, glass, foil, gas and soil.

RFEM's cross-section library includes rolled, built-up, thin-walled, and thick-walled cross-sections for steel, concrete, and timber.

References 

Building information modeling
Computer-aided design software
Finite element software
Computer-aided design software for Windows